Riezlern is a village in Mittelberg, Vorarlberg, Austria.

In the winter season it is well known as a centre for alpine skiing. A well known hotel in the village is Hotel Erlebach.

Education
Kindergarten:
 Kindergarten Riezlern

References 

Cities and towns in Bregenz District